Someone at the Door is a 1936 British drama film directed by Herbert Brenon and starring Aileen Marson, Billy Milton, Noah Beery, John Irwin and Edward Chapman. A journalist comes up with a scheme to boost his career by inventing a fake murder but soon becomes embroiled in trouble when a real killing takes place. It is based on a successful West End play by Campbell Christie and his wife Dorothy.

Plot
When penniless Sally (Aileen Marson) inherits a decrepit country manor, formerly her childhood home, she moves in with her younger brother Ronald (Billy Milton). An ambitious young  journalist, Ronald comes up with an outlandish scheme to get his first big story. He plans to hide Sally in the house, to fake her death, and then get himself arrested for her murder. When Sally suddenly reappears at his trial, it will prove his innocence, and leave Ronald to supply his paper with an exclusive story. However, the siblings uncover a real mystery when they become mixed up with jewel thieves, whose loot is hidden in their house.

Cast
Billy Milton as Ronald Martin  	
Aileen Marson as Sally Martin 	
 	Noah Beery as Harry Kapel  
Edward Chapman as Price 
John Irwin as Bill Reid 
 	Hermione Gingold as Mrs Appleby 
Charles Mortimer as Sgt Spedding  	
 Edward Dignon as Soames	
	Lawrence Hanray as Poole 
	Jimmy Godden as PC O'Brien

Critical reception
The Radio Times preferred the film's 1950 remake, "although, in this case, that's not saying much, as the 1950 version of Campbell and Dorothy Christie's old theatrical chestnut wasn't very good either. Contrived only goes part way to describing this creaky thriller"; while Infernal Cinema described the film as "a little like a game of Cluedo come to life," and appreciated, "A short yet entertaining thriller from the thirties," concluding, "Brenon is sometimes under appreciated in the history of cinema, Someone at the Door is a brisk reminder of his talent."

References

External links

1936 films
1936 drama films
Films shot at British International Pictures Studios
1930s English-language films
British drama films
British black-and-white films
British films based on plays
1930s British films